The 1979 NCAA Division I Men's Lacrosse Tournament was the 9th annual Division I NCAA Men's Lacrosse Championship tournament. Twelve NCAA Division I college men's lacrosse teams met after having played their way through a regular season, and for some, a conference tournament.

Tournament overview

The championship game was hosted by University of Maryland, and was played in front of 16,166 fans. The game saw the Johns Hopkins University defeat University of Maryland by the score of 15–9, taking control with five unanswered goals in the second period.

This tournament was notable as the only entry for North Carolina State led by Stan Cockerton, into the NCAA tournament. The lacrosse program at North Carolina State was discontinued shortly afterwards.

This was one of the great seasons in Hopkins' history, with highlights of the 13-0 season including wins over 2nd ranked Maryland and 5th ranked Virginia twice each, as well as wins over 3rd ranked Navy, 4th ranked Cornell, North Carolina State and 6th ranked Army. Hopkins was ranked Number One in the nation for 11 straight weeks, the team averaged over 15 goals a game and gave up under 7 goals a game, with only two teams able to score double digits in goals against Hopkins.

In the finals, Johns Hopkins used one of the all-time best defenses led by Hall of Fame goalie Mike Federico and defenseman Mark Greenberg, as well as a strong offense led by Dave Huntley and Jeff Cook defeating the Terrapins for the second time that season in winning their second consecutive NCAA title. The Number One seeding in the tournament went to the Blue Jays with a 10 and 0 regular season record and winners of 17 in a row since a mid-season defeat in 1978 by Cornell.

Syracuse appeared for the first time in an NCAA tournament, while Maryland was making its ninth straight tournament appearance. Following this title game, Hopkins had won or tied for 34 national championships, more than twice as many as any other school.

Hopkins had handed the Terrapins five of their losses over the prior three seasons, including consecutive defeats in the semifinals of the Division I tournaments in 1977 and 1978.

This was a great stretch of tournament play for the Terrapins as during the 1970s, Maryland participated in six NCAA title games, including four in a row from 1973 to 1976. During that span, the Terps won two national titles and lost four.<ref>United Press International. ''Hopkins sticks Terp '10. The Syracuse Herald Journal. May 27, 1979. pg. 31</ref>

Tournament results

Tournament boxscoresTournament FinalsTournament Semi-FinalsTournament QuarterfinalsTournament outstanding players

 Mike Federico, Goalie''', Johns Hopkins, tournament Most Outstanding Player

References

External links
 Sports Illustrated, June 4, 1979, Nobody Does It Better Than They Do

NCAA Division I Men's Lacrosse Championship
NCAA Division I Men's Lacrosse Championship
NCAA Division I Men's Lacrosse Championship
NCAA Division I Men's Lacrosse Championship
NCAA Division I Men's Lacrosse Championship